This is a list of former drill halls, TA Centres, and current Army Reserve Centres, within the county of Merseyside.

Former drill halls

19th Century

Early 20th Century

Late 20th Century

Current Army Reserve Centres

References

Bibliography
 Ray Westlake, The Territorials, 1908–1914: A Guide for Military and Family Historians, Casemate Publishers, 2012, 
 Anon, History of the 359 (4th West Lancs.) Medium Regiment R.A. (T.A.) 1859–1959, Liverpool: 359 Medium Regiment, 1959.
 Cliff Lord & Graham Watson, The Royal Corps of Signals: Unit Histories of the Corps (1920-2001) and Its Antecedents, Helion & Company Limited, 2014
 Norman Litchfield & Ray Westlake, The Volunteer Artillery 1859–1908 (Their Lineage, Uniforms and Badges), Nottingham: Sherwood Press, 1982, .
 Norman E.H. Litchfield, The Territorial Artillery 1908–1988 (Their Lineage, Uniforms and Badges), Nottingham: Sherwood Press, 1992, .
 J.B.M. Frederick, Lineage Book of British Land Forces 1660–1978, Vol II, Wakefield, Microform Academic, 1984, .
 Anthony Hogan, Merseyside at War, Amberley Publishing Limited, 2015, .
 Paul Knight, Liverpool Territorials in the Great War, Pen and Sword Books, 2016, .
 Stephen McGreal, Liverpool in the Great War, Pen and Sword Books, 2014, .
 Stephen McGreal, Wirral in the Great War, Pen and Sword Books, 2014, .
 John 'Jack' Handley, How I Survived the Great War, Lulu Press, Inc., 2016, .
 Graham E. Watson & Richard A. Rinaldi, The Corps of Royal Engineers: Organization and Units 1889–2018, Tiger Lily Books, 2018, .
 Allan Allport, Browned Off and Bloody-minded: The British Soldier Goes to War, 1939-1945, Yale University Press, 2015, .
 Allan Limited & Royal United Services Institute for Defence Studies, Armed Forces, 1982

Buildings and structures in Merseyside
Merseyside-related lists